Strolling may also refer to:

"Strolling", a song by Cole Porter
Strolling, a musical technique used on Way Out West (Sonny Rollins album)
"Strolling", a song on Grass Roots (Atban Klann album)
Strolling, a dance tradition of black Greek life in colleges and universities